Bridget Hill could refer to:

Bridget Hill (historian) (1922-2002), British feminist historian
Bridget Hill (politician), American lawyer and Attorney General of Wyoming